Julius Petschek (14 March 1856 – 22 January 1932) was an industrialist of Jewish origin in former Czechoslovakia (now Czech Republic). Together with his brother Ignaz, he was one of the wealthiest persons of interwar Czechoslovakia.

Petschek was born in Kolín. He and his brothers Isidor (1854–1919) and Ignaz (1857–1934) played an important role in the coal industry of the young Czechoslovakia. Their concern controlled also 30% of the German and in total almost 50% of the European brown coal mining industry in the years after World War I.

In 1920 Ignaz founded the Petschek Brothers Bank (Bankhaus Petschek & Co.) in Prague that was directed by 6 family members including Julius. After he died in 1932 his son Walter and Isador's son Hans ran the company until 1938 when they moved to New York as a consequence of the Munich Agreement. Julius is known for commissioning the bank's Petschek Palace in Prague that was used by the Gestapo in World War II.

Julius Petschek died in Prague and is buried at the New Jewish Cemetery.

References

1856 births
1932 deaths
People from Kolín
20th-century Czech businesspeople
Czech Jews
Czech bankers
Czechoslovak businesspeople